Julie le Brocquy is co-founder of le Brocquy Fraser Productions.  Her production credits include the award-winning Osama.

Early life 
Le Brocquy was born in Dublin, Ireland in 1960, and was raised and educated in Ireland.  Her father Noel le Brocquy was a businessman, and her
uncle Louis le Brocquy (1916-2012) was a prominent modern artist.

She went to in London to work as a banker, and became a trader with Salomon Brothers in the 1980s and 1990s. She later moved from London to Tokyo and then to Singapore.

Career
In Singapore, she founded Clockwork Productions with Julia Fraser. Then Fraser and le Brocquy met the film director U-Wei Haji Saari, with whom they founded Le Brocquy Fraser. Productions with which le Brocquy has been associated include a number filmed in Malaysia, including Buai Laju Laju (2004) and Sepohon Rambutan (2006). She has also produced films in Iran, including Story Undone (2004) and Bibi (2008). She earned critical attention internationally for the film Osama (2004) which was made in Afghanistan.

Filmography

References

External links
 Website - lebrocquyfraser.com

Living people
Year of birth missing (living people)
Irish film producers
Irish women film producers